The Personal Watercraft Industry Association (PWIA) is an American association of  personal watercraft (PWC) manufacturers. It is an affiliate of the larger National Marine Manufacturers Association, and was founded in 1987.

The PWIA promotes the use of PWCs, and lobbies government agencies on boating and environmental regulations.

Members
American Honda Motor
Bombardier Recreational Products
Kawasaki Heavy Industries
Yamaha Motor Corporation

See also
American Power Boat Association

External links
 Personal Watercraft Industry Association Official website

Personal water craft
Boating associations
Organizations established in 1987
Maritime safety
1987 establishments in the United States
Organizations based in Washington, D.C.